S. elegantissima may refer to:
 Sasakiconcha elegantissima, a sea snail species
 Schefflera elegantissima, the false aralia, a plant species native to New Caledonia
 Seguenzia elegantissima, a sea snail species